Larysa Sinchuk (born August 9, 1965) is a Ukrainian Paralympic volleyballist who won two bronze medals for 1993 and 2001 sitting volleyball participation and won gold and silver for 1997 and 2005 competitions.

References

1965 births
Paralympic volleyball players of Ukraine
Paralympic bronze medalists for Ukraine
Living people
Medalists at the 2012 Summer Paralympics
Volleyball players at the 2012 Summer Paralympics
Ukrainian sitting volleyball players
Women's sitting volleyball players
Paralympic medalists in volleyball